Kirk Ireton is a civil parish in the Derbyshire Dales district of Derbyshire, England. The parish contains 27 listed buildings that are recorded in the National Heritage List for England. Of these, one is listed at Grade I, the highest of the three grades, one is at Grade II*, the middle grade, and the others are at Grade II, the lowest grade.  The parish contains the village of Kirk Ireton and the surrounding countryside.  Most of the listed buildings are houses, cottages and associated structures, farmhouses and farm buildings, and the others are churches and associated structures, and a public house.


Key

Buildings

References

Citations

Sources

 

Lists of listed buildings in Derbyshire